The 1933 season was the twenty-second season for Santos FC.

References

External links
Official Site 

Santos
1933
1933 in Brazilian football